The 1909 Idaho football team represented the University of Idaho in the 1909 college football season.  Idaho was led by first-year head coach John S. Grogan, and played as an independent.

Schedule

 One game was played on Friday (against Washington State in Moscow) and one on Thursday (at Boise against All Collegians on Thanksgiving)

References

External links
 Gem of the Mountains: 1911 University of Idaho yearbook (spring 1910) – 1909 football season
 Go Mighty Vandals – 1909 football season
 Idaho Argonaut – student newspaper – 1909 editions

Idaho
Idaho Vandals football seasons
Idaho football